Cognac Skënderbeu is an Albanian cognac produced and degusted for the first time on September 1, 1967, by then government-owned Kantina Skënderbeu.

The alcohol is prepared and aged only in vats, tuns and barrels made by oak wood, which gives it its unique aroma, bouquet and special colour. Its main ingredients are: aged raki, mountain plants extract, processed fruit (grapes, lemon, black plum), ethyl alcohol, sugar syrup, flower honey, distilled water, caramel, etc.

See also
 Cocktails made with cognac or brandy

References

Albanian alcoholic drinks
Albanian brands
Drink companies of Albania